The 2021 Florida Gators baseball team represented the University of Florida in the sport of baseball during the 2021 college baseball season. Florida competed in the Eastern Division of the Southeastern Conference (SEC). Home games were played at Florida Ballpark on the university's Gainesville, Florida campus, in the first season at the ballpark. The team was coached by Kevin O'Sullivan in his fourteenth season as Florida's head coach. The Gators entered the season looking to return to the College World Series after an early regional exit from the 2019 NCAA Tournament (no tournament held in 2020 due to COVID-19).

Entering the season as the unanimous No. 1 ranked team, the Gators were swiftly eliminated from their own regional after losing 5–3 to South Florida and 19–1 to South Alabama.

Previous season
The Gators finished the abridged 2020 season with a 16–1 record – highlighted by a 16–0 start – and did not play any conference games.  They finished ranked No. 1 in all five major polls.

Preseason

SEC media poll

Personnel

By player

By position

Coaching staff

Schedule

Schedule Source:
*Rankings are based on the team's current ranking in the D1Baseball poll. Parentheses indicate tournament seedings.

Record vs. conference opponents

Rankings

2021 MLB draft

Fabian did not sign with the Red Sox and returned to Florida.

References

Florida
Florida Gators baseball seasons
Florida Gators baseball